The United States Post Office and Courthouse is a historic combined post office and Federal courthouse located in Baltimore, Maryland, United States.

Description
It is of steel frame construction with concrete floors and tile roof, basement of granite, and outer walls of white Indiana limestone. The structure is six stories in height and provided with basement and two sub-basements. It was completed in 1932 under the supervision the Office of the Supervising Architect under James A. Wetmore, and features classical ornamentation.

Cases
Some notable court cases held in this building include: 
1934: Judge W. Calvin Chesnut became the first jurist to strike down a New Deal Act of Congress.
1948: Alger Hiss filed a libel suit against Whittaker Chambers
1968 and 1969: the Berrigans were indicted in this courthouse for destroying Federal records as a protest against the Vietnam War. 
1973: Vice President Spiro T. Agnew pleaded nolo contedre to tax evasion and resigned as Vice President.
2009: Mayor Sheila Dixon was tried for 12 counts including perjury, theft and misconduct. She was convicted of fraudulent misappropriation and eventually resigned as mayor as part of a plea bargain in the Sheila Dixon trial.

Present
The U.S. Post Office and Courthouse was listed on the National Register of Historic Places in 1977. It has since been conveyed to the City of Baltimore, and is in use by the Baltimore city courts and known as Courthouse East.

Description
The building occupies an entire city block and measures 238 feet, 2 inches east-west by 279 feet, 10 inches north-south.  It is of steel frame construction with concrete floors and tile roof, basement of granite, and outer walls of white Indiana limestone.  The structure is six stories in height and provided with basement and two sub-basements. It was completed in 1932 under the supervision the Office of the Supervising Architect under James A. Wetmore, and features classical ornamentation.

Cases
Some notable court cases held in this building include: 
1934: Judge W. Calvin Chesnut became the first jurist to strike down a New Deal Act of Congress.
1948: William L. Marbury Jr. filed a libel suit for his client Alger Hiss against Whittaker Chambers
1968 and 1969: the Berrigans were indicted in this courthouse for destroying Federal records as a protest against the Vietnam War. 
1973: Vice President Spiro T. Agnew pleaded nolo contedre to tax evasion and resigned as Vice President.
2009: Mayor Sheila Dixon was tried for 12 counts including perjury, theft and misconduct. She was convicted of fraudulent misappropriation and eventually resigned as mayor as part of a plea bargain in the Sheila Dixon trial.

Present
The U.S. Post Office and Courthouse was listed on the National Register of Historic Places in 1977. It has since been conveyed to the City of Baltimore, and is in use by the Baltimore city courts and known as Courthouse East.

References

External links

Historic Federal Courthouses page from the Federal Judicial Center.
, including photo from 1985, at Maryland Historical Trust

Courthouses in Maryland
Downtown Baltimore
Government buildings in Baltimore
Baltimore
Baltimore
Government buildings completed in 1930
Federal courthouses in the United States
Government buildings on the National Register of Historic Places in Baltimore
1930 establishments in Maryland